The Poeciliini is a tribe of killifishes from the "livebearer" family Poeciliidae, consisting of six genera and just over 100 species.

Genera
The genera classified in this tribe are:

 Limia Poey, 1854
 Micropoecilia Hubbs, 1926
 Pamphorichthys Regan, 1913
 Phallichthys Hubbs, 1924
 Poecilia Bloch & Schneider, 1801
 Xiphophorus Heckel, 1848

References

Poeciliidae
Taxa named by Charles Lucien Bonaparte